STS-51-C (formerly STS-10) was the 15th flight of NASA's Space Shuttle program, and the third flight of Space Shuttle Discovery. It launched on January 24, 1985, and made the fourth shuttle landing at Kennedy Space Center, Florida, on January 27, 1985. STS-51-C was the first shuttle mission to deploy a dedicated United States Department of Defense (DoD) payload, and consequently many mission details remain classified.

Crew

Backup crew

Crew seating arrangements

Mission summary 

STS-51-C launched from Kennedy Space Center (KSC) on January 24, 1985, at 19:50:00 UTC, and was the first of nine shuttle missions in 1985. It was originally scheduled for January 23, 1985, but was delayed because of freezing weather. Challenger had been scheduled for this flight, but Discovery was substituted when problems were encountered with Challenger thermal protection tiles. STS-51-C marked the 100th human spaceflight to achieve orbit.

The mission's length of three days was shorter than the week or longer of most civilian shuttle flights. It was the first dedicated to the U.S. Department of Defense (DoD), and most information about it remains classified. For the first time, NASA did not provide pre-launch commentary to the public until nine minutes before liftoff. The U.S. Air Force only stated that the shuttle successfully launched its payload with an Inertial Upper Stage (IUS) on the mission's seventh orbit. It is believed that the payload was a Magnum SIGINT satellite into geosynchronous orbit. Other DoD flights STS-33 and STS-38 could have carried similar payloads. Payton stated in 2009 that STS-51-C's payload is "still up there, and still operating". Payton was a USAF Manned Spaceflight Engineer (MSE); the USAF declined a NASA offer to fly another MSE on the mission.

Also, according to Aviation Week, the shuttle initially entered a  orbit, at an inclination of 28.45° to the equator. It then executed three Orbital Maneuvering System (OMS) burns, the last being executed on the fourth orbit.

The mission lasted 3 days, 1 hour, 33 minutes, and 23 seconds. Discovery touched down on SLF Runway 15 at KSC on January 27, 1985, at 21:23:23 UTC. IMAX footage of the STS-51-C launch was used in the 1985 movie The Dream is Alive.

Mission insignia  
The crew insignia for STS Flight 51-C includes the names of its five crewmembers. The STS 51-C mission marked the third trip of the Space Shuttle Discovery into space, which is referenced by the three colored trailing strips behind the orbiter in the United States red, white and blue. It was the first Space Shuttle mission totally dedicated to the U.S. Department of Defense, hence the DoD central eagle on the mission patch. The five stars on the upper part of the golden band of the DoD insignia represent the five astronauts. As this mission was classified, the patch includes no further detail as to the mission's payload or nature. For similar reasons, the name of the used orbiter was omitted from the patch.

Connection to the Challenger disaster 
Almost exactly a year after STS-51-C, Space Shuttle Challenger was destroyed with all hands on board during the STS-51-L mission including Ellison Onizuka, a crew member on both flights. As part of the investigation into the disaster, it was reported to the Rogers Commission that during the launch of STS-51-C, the worst Space Shuttle Solid Rocket Booster (SRB) blow-by effects of any mission prior to STS-51-L occurred, indicating conclusively that the Viton O-rings were not sufficiently sealing the hot gases inside the combustion chambers of the SRBs while firing. After they were recovered post-flight, the O-rings in both the right and left SRBs showed some degree of charring, but analysis of the center field joint of the right SRB showed an unprecedented penetration of the primary O-ring and heavy charring on the secondary O-ring.

This information is significant to the established consensus that low air temperature was a major factor in Challengers destruction because the temperature at STS-51-C's launch was also, up to its time, the coldest recorded during a shuttle launch, at only .

See also 

 List of human spaceflights
 List of Space Shuttle missions

References

External links 
 NASA mission summary 

Space Shuttle missions
1985 in spaceflight
Spacecraft launched in 1985
1985 in the United States
Spacecraft which reentered in 1985
Department of Defense Space Shuttle missions
Ken Mattingly